Earl of the Island of Jersey, usually shortened to Earl of Jersey, is a title in the Peerage of England. It is held by a branch of the Villiers family, which since 1819 has been the Child Villiers family.

History

The earldom was created in 1697 for the statesman Edward Villiers, 1st Viscount Villiers, Ambassador to France from 1698 to 1699 and Secretary of State for the Southern Department from 1699 to 1700. He had already been created Baron Villiers, of Hoo in the County of Kent, and Viscount Villiers, of Dartford in the County of Kent, in 1691, also in the Peerage of England.

A member of the prominent Villiers family, he was the grandson of Sir Edward Villiers, brother of Sir William Villiers, 1st Baronet, of Brooksby, and half-brother of George Villiers, 1st Duke of Buckingham, Christopher Villiers, 1st Earl of Anglesey and John Villiers, 1st Viscount Purbeck. He was succeeded by his son, the second Earl. He represented Kent in the House of Commons from 1705 to 1708. On his death, the titles passed to his eldest son, the third Earl. In 1766, he succeeded his second cousin John Villiers, 1st Earl Grandison, as sixth Viscount Grandison through a special remainder in the letters patent.

His son, the fourth Earl, was a politician and served as Vice-Chamberlain of the Household, as Master of the Buckhounds and as Captain of the Honourable Band of Gentlemen Pensioners. He was succeeded by his son, the fifth Earl. He was a Tory politician and served as Lord Chamberlain of the Household and as Master of the Horse. Lord Jersey married Sarah Sophia (died 1867), daughter of John Fane, 10th Earl of Westmorland, and his wife Sarah Anne (died 1793), daughter of Robert Child. Through this marriage, the private bank Child & Co. came into the Villiers family.

On account of the considerable wealth brought to the family through this marriage, in 1819, Lord Jersey assumed by Royal licence the surname and arms of Child, and since then the branch of the family has been known as Child-Villiers. On his death, the titles passed to his son, the sixth Earl. He sat as Conservative Member of Parliament for Rochester, Minehead, Honiton and Weymouth and Melcombe Regis and Cirencester. He succeeded in the earldom on 3 October 1859 and died on 24 October 1859, having held the title for only twenty-one days. Lord Jersey married Julia, daughter of Prime Minister Sir Robert Peel, 2nd Baronet, in 1841.

He was succeeded by his son, the seventh Earl. He served in the second Conservative administration of Lord Salisbury as Paymaster-General from 1889 to 1890 and was Governor of New South Wales from 1890 to 1893. On his death in 1915, the titles passed to his eldest son, the eighth Earl. He served briefly under David Lloyd George as a Lord-in-waiting (government whip in the House of Lords) from January to August 1919. In 1923, he sold Child & Co to Glyn, Mills & Co. His son, the ninth Earl, was a Major in the Royal Artillery (TA).

 the titles are held by the latter's grandson, the tenth Earl, who succeeded in 1998. He is the eldest son of George Henry Villiers, Viscount Villiers (1948–1998), eldest son of the ninth Earl. Lord Jersey is an actor, writer and producer, known professionally as William Villiers.

The heirs apparent to the earldom alternate the use of the two viscomital titles as their courtesy title. The tenth Earl was briefly styled Viscount Grandison between the deaths of his father, Viscount Villiers, and his grandfather, the ninth Earl, and so the next heir is therefore styled Viscount Villiers.

The present family seat is Radier Manor, on the island of Jersey. Previous family seats were Middleton Park in Oxfordshire and Osterley Park in Middlesex.

The Earls of Jersey are also in remainder of the title of Duke of Marlborough, for being descendants of one of the daughters of his daughters, by primogeniture, and their heirs male of the 1st Duke.

The parish church of All Saints at Middleton Stoney, near Middleton Park, is the burial place of most of the Earls of Jersey.

Earl of Clarendon
Another member of the family to gain distinction was the Hon. Thomas Villiers, second son of the second Earl. He was created Earl of Clarendon in 1776 (see this title for more information on this branch of the family).

Jacobite earldoms of Jersey
In April 1716, two Jacobite earldoms of Jersey were created by the Old Pretender, the first for Barbara, née Chiffinch, the widow of the first Earl of the 1697 creation, and the other for their eldest son (who succeeded as second Earl of the 1697 creation) with the subsidiary titles Viscount Dartford and Baron Hoo. The first became extinct on the Countess's death in 1735.

Earls of Jersey (1697)
Edward Villiers, 1st Earl of Jersey (1656–1711)
William Villiers, 2nd Earl of Jersey (died 1721)
William Villiers, 3rd Earl of Jersey (died 1769)
Frederick William Villiers, Viscount Villiers (1734–1742)
George Bussy Villiers, 4th Earl of Jersey (1735–1805)
George Child Villiers, 5th Earl of Jersey (1773–1859)
George Augustus Frederick Child-Villiers, 6th Earl of Jersey (1808–1859)
Victor Albert George Child-Villiers, 7th Earl of Jersey (1845–1915)
George Henry Robert Child-Villiers, 8th Earl of Jersey (1873–1923)
George Francis Child-Villiers, 9th Earl of Jersey (1910–1998)
George Child Villiers, Viscount Villiers (1948–1998)
(George Francis) William Child-Villiers, 10th Earl of Jersey (born 1976)

The heir apparent is the present holder's only son, George Henry William Child-Villiers, Viscount Villiers (born 2015)

See also
Jersey
Duke of Buckingham (1623 creation)
Earl of Anglesey (1623 creation)
Viscount Purbeck
Earl of Clarendon (1776 creation)
Viscount Grandison
Villiers baronets
Osterley Park

References

Book cited

 
Earldoms in the Peerage of England

Earldoms in the Jacobite Peerage
Noble titles created in 1697
Noble titles created in 1716